Persepolis Basketball Club is an Iranian basketball club based in Tehran, Iran. In may 2006, the team did poorly in the Iranian Basketball Super League and was under financial pressure.

See also

 Persepolis club

References 

Basketball teams in Iran
basketball